The 2012 Afar region tourist attack was a shooting incident on the night of 17 January 2012 at Erta Ale volcano in the Afar Region of Ethiopia which killed 5 and injured 3. Four people were kidnapped in the attack.

Bereket Simon, the country's communications minister told Reuters the attack was carried out at 5 am on 17 January, by Eritrean-trained groups. Two foreigners, a driver, and a policeman were kidnapped. Eritrea denied having trained and armed the attackers.

It was later revealed that two Germans, two Hungarians and an Austrian were killed in the attack. Two Germans and two Ethiopians were kidnapped. Three people injured: two Belgians and a Hungarian. The Germans were released 7 March the same year.

See also
List of terrorist incidents, 2012

References

Attacks in Africa in 2012
Austrian people murdered abroad
Terrorist incidents in Africa in 2012
Mass murder in 2012
German people murdered abroad
Hungarian people murdered abroad
Terrorist incidents in Ethiopia
Spree shootings in Ethiopia
Afar Region
Attacks on tourists
Second Afar insurgency
January 2012 crimes
2012 murders in Ethiopia